Manuel Rodriguez Navarro (born January 8, 1969, in Las Palmas de Gran Canaria) is a wheelchair basketball athlete from Spain. He has a physical disability: he is a 4-point wheelchair basketball player. He played wheelchair basketball at the 1996 Summer Paralympics. His team was fourth.

References 

Wheelchair category Paralympic competitors
Spanish men's wheelchair basketball players
Paralympic wheelchair basketball players of Spain
Living people
1969 births
Wheelchair basketball players at the 1996 Summer Paralympics
Sportspeople from Las Palmas
20th-century Spanish people